Jennifer Janse van Rensburg (née Urban; born 9 May 1993) is a German ice dancer. With her skating partner, Benjamin Steffan, she is the 2020 Santa Claus Cup champion, the 2021 Egna Dance Trophy silver medalist, the 2022 Bavarian Open champion, and the 2022 and 2023 German national champion.

Personal life 
Jennifer Urban was born on 9 May 1993 in Oberstdorf, Germany.

Programs

With Steffan

With Lerche

Ladies' singles

Competitive highlights 
GP: Grand Prix; CS: Challenger Series

Ice dance with Steffan

Ice dance with Lerche

Ladies' singles

References

External links 
 
 
 
 

1993 births
Living people
German female ice dancers
German female single skaters
People from Oberstdorf
Sportspeople from Swabia (Bavaria)
Competitors at the 2015 Winter Universiade
Competitors at the 2017 Winter Universiade